Old Kaduna Airport is an airport serving Kaduna, the capital of the Kaduna State of Nigeria.

The Kaduna non-directional beacon (Ident: KD) and VOR-DME (Ident: KUA) are located on the field.

It appears to be the headquarters of the Nigerian Air Force Training Command with a flying training group and a ground training group at the base. The command is chiefly responsible for implementing NAF training policies. Ground training is also provided for support services and technical personnel.
301 Flying Training School, Kaduna
303 Flying Training School, Kano
320 Technical Training Group, Kaduna
325 Ground Training Group, Kaduna

See also

Transport in Nigeria
List of airports in Nigeria

References

External links
OpenStreetMap - Kaduna
Google Maps - Kaduna

Airports in Nigeria
Kaduna